Georges Carpentier (12 January 1894 – 28 October 1975) was a French boxer, actor and World War I pilot. He fought mainly as a light heavyweight and heavyweight in a career lasting from 1908 to 1926. Carpentier was known for his speed, his excellent boxing skills and his extremely hard punch. The Parisian Sports Arena Halle Georges Carpentier is named after him.

Biography 

Born in Liévin in Pas-de-Calais, Carpentier began his career by progressing up through the weight divisions, fighting in every division from welterweight upwards. After making his first professional bout at age 14, he was welterweight champion of France and of Europe in 1911, middleweight champion of Europe in 1912, and light heavyweight champion of Europe in 1913. On 1 June 1913, he beat "Bombardier" Billy Wells in Ghent, Belgium to become heavyweight champion of Europe. He defended his title in December against Wells, in January 1914 against Pat O'Keeffe and in London on 16 July he beat Ed "Gunboat" Smith to add the "White Heavyweight Champion of the World" to his European title. The white heavyweight title bout sported a purse worth £9,000 (equivalent to approximately £ today).

Carpentier was also a referee during the early stages of his career, supervising a number of fights including the world title bout between Jack Johnson and Frank Moran in June 1914. Carpentier was a French Air Force aviator during World War I and was awarded two of the highest French military honors, the Croix de Guerre and the Médaille Militaire. This served to heighten his already exceptional popularity, not only in France but also in the United Kingdom and the United States.

Carpentier defended his title twice again in 1919 before dropping down a weight class to challenge Battling Levinsky for the light heavyweight championship of the world. The fight took place on 12 October 1920, in Jersey City and Levinsky was knocked out in the fourth. Carpentier's attempt at the heavyweight Championship of the world came on 2 July 1921, again in Jersey City, when he faced Jack Dempsey in front of boxing's first million dollar gate (approximately $ today). Carpentier was badly beaten around before suffering a knockout in the second minute of the fourth round. Carpentier never fought again for that title. He lost his world light heavyweight title and his European heavyweight and light heavyweight titles the following year, on 24 September 1922, in a controversial bout with Senegalese fighter Battling Siki. His last truly noteworthy fight was on 24 July 1924, with Gene Tunney at the Polo Grounds in Manhattan, New York City. Carpentier lost the bout by TKO after fifteen rounds. He retired from the ring after a final exhibition bout in 1927.

Following his retirement from boxing, Carpentier spent a number of years as a vaudeville song-and-dance man, mostly in the UK and the US. He is the author of a boxing novel, Brothers of the Brown Owl: A Story of the Boxing Ring published c. 1920 by Cassell and Company (being a volume in the uniform Cassell's Empire Library). He also appeared in half a dozen motion pictures, starring in both silent films and talkies. He made three films in Hollywood, US, one for director J. Stuart Blackton in England and two in his native France. His last screen appearance was in 1934. Soon after, he became proprietor of an upmarket bar, Chez Georges Carpentier, in a chic Paris neighbourhood. In several different locations, this is the profession he would exercise until shortly before his death.

From the time they boxed together in 1921, Carpentier remained close friends with Jack Dempsey. They visited each other in New York and Paris, got together to commemorate the anniversary of their famous bout and exchanged birthday greetings.

Death 
Carpentier died in Paris at age 81 in 1975 of a heart attack, and was buried in the cimetière de Vaires-sur-Marne, Seine-et-Marne, France.

Legacy 
He was elected to the International Boxing Hall of Fame in 1991.

Selected filmography
 The Wonder Man (1920)
 A Gipsy Cavalier (1922)
 The Show of Shows (1929)
 Hold Everything (1930)

Professional boxing record

All newspaper decisions are officially regarded as “no decision” bouts and are not counted in the win/loss/draw column.

See also
List of light heavyweight boxing champions

References 

|-

|-

External links 
 
 Carpentier vs Gene Tunney - Fight by Rounds - July 25, 1924
 Carpentier vs Gene Tunney - July 25, 1924
 
 Georges Carpentier at Virtual History
  www.georgescarpentier.org (biographical website devoted to Carpentier, including extensive text, images, some video) 

1894 births
1975 deaths
People from Liévin
French male boxers
French male film actors
French military personnel of World War I
French male silent film actors
Heavyweight boxers
Light-heavyweight boxers
Vaudeville performers
World boxing champions
French World War I pilots
Recipients of the Croix de Guerre 1914–1918 (France)
European Boxing Union champions
World white heavyweight boxing champions
20th-century French male actors
International Boxing Hall of Fame inductees
Sportspeople from Pas-de-Calais